Samuel Lewis Tordoff (born 19 April 1989) is a British racing car driver best known for his appearances in the British Touring Car Championship. He is the grandson of rally driver and car dealer Jack Tordoff. Tordoff finished second overall in the 2016 British Touring Car Championship, 2 points behind Gordon Shedden. Tordoff supports his racing career with his day-to-day job as an accountant.

Racing career

Renault Clio Cup UK
In February 2009, Bradford-born Tordoff joined the Renault Clio Cup UK grid with Total Control Racing. He took his first podium finish in the Saturday race at Snetterton with second place behind Alex MacDowall, then followed this up by taking his maiden win with a lights to flag victory ahead of championship leader Phil Glew. Tordoff finished eighth in his first season of car racing.

He continued in the Clio Cup in 2010, where he finished on the podium at 12 out of the 18 races he competed in. Tordoff took his first win of the year in race two at Snetterton in almost the same circumstances as his first, the previous season. He finished third in the championship having missed the final round at Brands Hatch to race in the British Touring Car Championship, becoming the fifth Clio Cup graduate to compete in the BTCC, in 2010.

British Touring Car Championship

Triple 8 Race Engineering (2010; 2013–2014)

He made his British Touring Car Championship debut competing in the final meeting of the 2010 season at Brands Hatch, driving a Vauxhall Vectra for Uniq Racing with Triple Eight. In the final round he placed 10th, scoring one championship point.

Tordoff returned to the BTCC in 2013 driving for Triple 8 Race Engineering, now branded as MG KX Momentum Racing where he raced alongside Jason Plato. He claimed his first podium finish in the BTCC in the third race of the season at Brands Hatch, finishing third behind the Team Dynamics Hondas. He secured his first BTCC pole position at Snetterton, leading an MG 1–2 ahead of Plato. He finished the year in sixth place in the drivers' championship. Tordoff remained with Triple 8 for 2014, scoring another win at Donington Park, en route to seventh place in the final drivers' championship standings.

West Surrey Racing (2015–2016)
It was announced on 10 December 2014 that Tordoff had signed for the West Surrey Racing team for the 2015. He took his first win for the team at the Oulton Park round.

He continued with the team in 2016 and went on to take 2 race wins and a further 7 podiums.  After leading the championship for most of the second half of the year, he was pipped at the last race of the season by Gordon Shedden who took the crown by just 2 points.

Tordoff announced he was quitting the series on 23 November 2016, but stated he was open to a return in the future.

Motorbase Performance (2018–)

Tordoff announced he would return to the BTCC in 2018 on the 12 February, piloting an all new Ford Focus RS run by Motorbase Performance.

Porsche Carrera Cup Great Britain
In 2011, it was announced that he would be driving for Team Parker Racing in the Porsche Carrera Cup GB. He had a best result of third in the Porsche Carrera World Cup race at the Nürburgring and he won a set of tyres at Rockingham, courtesy of series sponsor Michelin. Tordoff finished the championship seventh in his first season.

Tordoff stayed at Team Parker Racing for 2012 where he would race alongside fellow Yorkshire racers Richard Plant and Daniel Lloyd. He took his first win in the series at Oulton Park having started from pole position and resisted race long pressure from championship leader Michael Meadows. He went on to win both races at Snetterton and won the season finale at Brands Hatch; he finished third in the championship, 46 points behind champion Meadows and 8 points behind second placed Ben Barker.

Porsche Supercup
Tordoff was one of seven drivers from the Porsche Carrera Cup GB to compete in the Silverstone round of the Porsche Supercup in 2011. He competed in the race once again in 2012, finishing 12th as best of the Great Britain championship entrants.

GT racing

Tordoff announced that he would be joining the British GT Championship in 2017, driving for Barwell Motorsport alongside fellow former BTCC driver Liam Griffin. In addition, in March 2017, Strakka Racing announced that Tordoff would race for them in the 2017 Blancpain GT Series Endurance Cup, sharing a McLaren 650 GT3 with David Fumanelli and Jonny Kane.

Personal life
In September 2019, Tordoff's son died a few days after birth due to a kidney deformity. He subsequently pulled out of the BTCC round at Knockhill.

Racing record

Complete British Touring Car Championship results
(key) (Races in bold indicate pole position – 1 point awarded in first race; races in italics indicate fastest lap – 1 point awarded all races; * signifies that driver lead race for at least one lap – 1 point awarded all races)

Complete European Le Mans Series results

Complete British GT Championship results
(key) (Races in bold indicate pole position) (Races in italics indicate fastest lap)

References

External links
 

1989 births
Living people
English racing drivers
British Touring Car Championship drivers
Porsche Supercup drivers
European Le Mans Series drivers
Porsche Carrera Cup GB drivers
24H Series drivers
Renault UK Clio Cup drivers
BMW M drivers
Strakka Racing drivers
Blancpain Endurance Series drivers
McLaren Racing drivers